Tunita is an extinct genus of prehistoric mackerel that lived during the Upper Miocene subepoch of Southern California.

See also

 Prehistoric fish
 List of prehistoric bony fish

References

Prehistoric perciform genera
Miocene fish
Miocene fish of North America